Graham Duff (born 13 April 1964) is an English writer, actor and producer. He was born in Blackburn, Lancashire, and lives in Brighton. He graduated from the University of Brighton.  His work for TV and radio is typified by intricate plotting, large casts, frequently dark subject matter and a love of wordplay and surrealism.  

His writing is influenced by the worlds of horror and science fiction, musical sub-cultures and the realms of fine art and art house cinema.  He is a noted music enthusiast, having worked as a DJ and selected all the soundtrack music for seven series of his TV show Ideal, as well as compiling an Ideal soundtrack album and helping to release albums by the left-field bands Celebricide and Cyclobe.  He also worked as a script editor on seven series of BBC Radio 4's Count Arthur Strong's Radio Show! and the Alan Partridge movie Alpha Papa (2013).

Early career
Duff began writing and performing in the mid-1980s with the performance art group Theatre of the Bleeding Obelisk and the fringe theatre company Wax Cabinet.  During this period, he also worked occasionally as an assistant editor at Ikon, the video department of Manchester's Factory Records.  By the early 1990s he was a member of the comedy improvisation group "Fish-heads".  With Wax Cabinet colleague Malcolm Boyle, he wrote for BBC Radio 1's Mark Goodier Show and contributed sketches to BBC Radio 3's The Music Makers.  Duff also DJ’d and hosted comedy phone-in shows in the guise of self-help guru Doctor Devlin on a number of independent and pirate radio stations, as well as presenting "The Duff Almanac", a regular feature on BBC Radio 4's Loose Ends.

Stage
His first one-man stage show was ‘Burroughs’ (1992) – based on the life and times of infamous beat author William S. Burroughs.  The show won a Brighton Festival award and was followed by "Diary of a Madman" (1993), adapted from the novel of the same name by Russian absurdist author Nikolai Gogol.  With comedian and writer James Poulter, Duff toured internationally with the stand up shows "The A-Z of Drugs" (1995) and "The A-Z of Taboo" (1996).  These were followed by another solo comedy show "Vinyl Anorak" (1997) about the world of music obsessives.

Television
Along with Henry Normal and Steve Coogan, Duff co-wrote the six-part comedy horror homage Dr. Terrible's House of Horrible  (BBC2 2001), which starred Coogan in seven roles; Duff appeared in four supporting roles. Duff then created and wrote all 53 episodes of Ideal (BBC3 & BBC2 2005–2011) starring Johnny Vegas as Salford cannabis dealer Moz. Duff also appeared in the show as the promiscuous and bitchy gay man Brian, as well as an uncredited role as Moz's frightening, masked neighbour Fist.  He co-wrote two series and a Christmas special of the sit-com Hebburn (BBC2 2012–2013) with stand-up comedian and series creator Jason Cook as well as appearing in several episodes as newspaper photographer David Cowgill.  He also created and wrote the Sky Arts television series The Nightmare Worlds of H. G. Wells which starred Ray Winstone, Michael Gambon and Rupert Graves; Duff also appeared in the first episode.

Radio
Duff wrote and performed the lead roles in his six-part comedy series Stereonation (adapted from the stage show Vinyl Anorak) which was broadcast on BBC Radio 4 in the summer of 1998.  From 1998 to 2000, he presented Totally Wired, an alternative music show on Brighton's Juice 107.2.  Following this, Duff wrote three series of the BBC Radio 4 sci-fi sit-com Nebulous (2005–2008) starring Mark Gatiss as Professor Nebulous.  The show featured Duff as the Professor's assistant Rory.  Duff has also worked as the script editor on all seven series of BBC Radio 4's Count Arthur Strong's Radio Show! (2005–2011) starring Steve Delaney, the fourth series of which won the prestigious Sony Gold Award. Duff currently presents a weekly show, Graham Duff's Mixtape, on Brighton based radio station Slack City which is run by the same directors as Juice 107.2.

Acting
Aside from appearing in his own work, Duff has a small speaking part, as a Death Eater in the films Harry Potter and the Deathly Hallows – Part 1 (2010) and Harry Potter and the Deathly Hallows – Part 2 (2011).  He has also appeared in ITV's comedy series Monkey Trousers (2005), Channel 4's Ketch & Hiro-pon Get it On (2008). He appeared as a convicted child molester and cult leader in two series of David Cross's dark sit-com The Increasingly Poor Decisions of Todd Margaret (2011) and as a Nazi in the Channel 4 comedy show Totally Tom (2011). He played greengrocer Mike Greatbatch in Alan Partridge: Welcome to the Places of My Life (2012) and press photographer David Cowgill in Hebburn (2012-2013). He also played a malevolent bio-mechanoid waiter in "Deep Breath", Peter Capaldi's debut episode of Doctor Who.

Other work
Duff has written articles for The Guardian and Wire Magazine.  He has also contributed a chapter to The Cosey Complex - a book about the life and work of musician and performance artist Cosey Fanni Tutti and written an introduction to "Tranart" a monograph on the visual art of Val Denham.  He's made guest contributions on a number of albums by "People Like Us" aka Vicki Bennett.  He acted in Exile — an audio drama based on Doctor Who, as well as writing another — Faith Stealer starring Paul McGann.  In 2013, alongside Pat Cahill he co-created and co-wrote "Still Reeling" a series of two on-line comedy blaps for Channel 4 on-line starring Matt King and Pat Cahill.

Partial filmography
Harry Potter and the Deathly Hallows – Part 1 (2010) - Death Eater
Harry Potter and the Deathly Hallows – Part 2 (2011) - Death Eater
High-Rise (2015) - Queue Person

References

External links

 
 Graham Duff's Mixtape on Slack City
 Graham Duff interview on Nebulous and Dr Terrible
 IDEAL (series) on BBC iPlayer

1964 births
Living people
Alumni of the University of Brighton
English radio writers
English screenwriters
English male screenwriters
English male television actors
English television producers